David Issa Mwantika (born 21 December 1988) is a Tanzanian football player. He plays for Azam.

International
He made his Tanzania national football team debut on 23 March 2016 in an AFCON qualifier against Chad.

He was selected for the 2019 Africa Cup of Nations squad.

References

External links
 
 

1988 births
Living people
Tanzanian footballers
Tanzania international footballers
Association football defenders
Azam F.C. players
2019 Africa Cup of Nations players